Royal Prussian Jagdstaffel 39, commonly abbreviated to Jasta 39, was a "hunting group" (i.e., fighter squadron) of the Luftstreitkräfte, the air arm of the Imperial German Army during World War I. The unit would score 68 aerial victories during the war, including 14 observation balloons downed. The squadron's victories came at the expense of seven pilots killed in action, one killed in a flying accident, five wounded in action, and one taken prisoner of war.

History
Jasta 39 was founded on 30 June 1917 at Fliegerersatz-Abteilung (Replacement Detachment) 15, Hannover, Germany. It held its first formation 2 August 1917, under its original commander, Karl August Raben. It would serve until war's end, when the Luftstreitkräfte was disbanded.

Commanding officers (Staffelführer)

 August Raben: 2 August 1917 (to Jasta 15 as Staffelführer on 14 March 1918)
 Franz von Kerssenbrock: 17 November 1917
 Josef Loeser: 4 December 1917
 Johann Hesselink: 4 April 1918

Duty stations

 Hannover, Germany: 30 June 1917
 Ensisheim: 2 August 1917
 Campoformido, Italy: 
 San Giacomo, Italy
 Roveredo, Italy
 Cervada, Italy
 San Fior, Italy
 St. Loup, Champagne, France: March 1918
 Boncourt, France
 Guesnain, France
 Bapaume, France
 Rocourt-Saint-Martin, France
 Erre, France
 Bühl, France

Notable personnel
 Bernhard Ultsch
 Wilhelm Hippert
 Ludwig Gaim
 Reinhold Jörke

Operations
Jasta 39 opened combat operations in support of Armee-Abteilung B on 15 August 1917. On 15 September 1917, it was transferred to Italy, where it would score 41 aerial victories. The squadron would return to France in March 1918, and serve there until war's end.

Aircraft
Jasta 39 operated Albatros D.III and Albatros D.V fighters while in Italy. It is not known what other aircraft were used.

References

Bibliography
 

39
Military units and formations established in 1917
1917 establishments in Germany
Military units and formations disestablished in 1918